A Commission of Review is an ad hoc court of the Church of England. 

A Commission of Review may be appointed by Her Majesty The Queen on the petition of an appellant to hear appeals from the Court for Ecclesiastical Causes Reserved in matters of doctrine, ritual or ceremony; and from the Commissions of Convocation. This would comprise three Lords of Appeal (being communicants) and 2 Lords Spiritual sitting as Lords of Parliament. If doctrine is in issue the Commission sits with five advisers chosen from panels of theologians

Church of England ecclesiastical polity
Ecclesiastical courts